Nzo or NZO may refer to:
 nZo, an American rapper and professional wrestler formerly known as Enzo Amore
 Nzo Ekangaki (1934–2005), a Cameroonian political figure
 New Zealand Opera, a professional opera company
 the New Zionist Organization, an organization founded by Ze'ev Jabotinsky and Benjamin Akzin
 NZO objects, in Ward doubles
 Nondiabetic Zealand Obese, a kind of mouse strain involved in experimentation in Metabolomics/Metabolites/Lipids

See also
N'Zoo, a town and sub-prefecture in the Lola Prefecture in the Nzérékoré Region of south-eastern Guinea